Keshorn "Keshie" Walcott, ORTT (born 2 April 1993) is a Trinidadian track and field athlete who competes in the javelin throw. He is an Olympic champion, having won gold in 2012. He is the first Caribbean male athlete, as well as the first of African descent, to win the gold medal in a throwing event in the history of the Olympics. He is also the holder of the North, Central American and Caribbean junior record.

Walcott is the youngest Olympic gold medallist in the men's javelin (19 years 131 days), and the first athlete in any track and field event to win World Junior and Olympic titles in an individual event the same year.

Career

Early life and medals
Born the third child of Beverly Walcott and Endy King, Walcott grew up playing football and cricket, striving to keep up with his athletically talented older brother Elton. He was raised in the fishing village of Toco, in north-east Trinidad. He did not take up the javelin until the age of 15, but found immediate success. By April 2009, one week after his 16th birthday, he was the Caribbean youth (under-17) champion.

In 2010 he stepped up to the standard regulation javelin (800-gram), and he continued his domination of the Caribbean junior division, as the three-time winner in the Junior (under-20) javelin throw at the CARIFTA Games in 2010 to 2012, setting a new NACAC North, Central American and Caribbean junior record in 2012.

2012 World Junior Champion
He began the Olympic year in April with his fourth-consecutive victory at CARIFTA Juniors. A record throw of  earned him the distinction of competing unbeaten throughout his CARIFTA career. In late May 2012 he twice improved his personal best, breaking through the 80-meter mark (262 feet) for the first time. It was also a NACAC junior record as well. One week later he reset all those marks, while competing at the IAAF International Centennial Meet in Havana, Cuba.

2012 London Olympic Champion

In the stadium on Saturday evening 11 August, made conditions for the javelin throw less than ideal, and worse than during Wednesday's qualifying rounds. Walcott responded to the pressure of the Olympic finals by throwing a personal best distance on his first throw, giving him the lead, and then exceeding that distance on his second throw. He won the Olympic javelin gold medal with a throw of 84.58m (277 ft 6 in). He defeated a string of top athletes to win the competition including 90-metre thrower Tero Pitkämäki and two-time defending Olympic champion Andreas Thorkildsen, as well as Veselý, Oleksandr Pyatnytsya and Antti Ruuskanen. This made Walcott the youngest-ever Olympic champion in javelin throw and the second non-European to win the Olympic gold in men's javelin throw since American thrower Cy Young in Helsinki in 1952.

Steve Backley, a former three-time Olympic medalist in the javelin remarked that it was a "surprise win for Keshorn Walcott. Everyone else struggled with the wind".

Following his Olympic victory, Walcott was hailed as a national hero. On 13 August, the day of his arrival back in Trinidad, was declared a national holiday. He was awarded $150,000 in cash and given land near his hometown of Toco, as well as a luxury home in Port of Spain. In addition, both the Toco lighthouse, (in north-east Trinidad) and the Toco Secondary School were renamed in his honour.

Walcott has been coached since 2009 by Cuban-born Ismael Lopez Mastrapa.

2013 to 2014
Walcott's 2013 season was hampered by injury.

In an early March 2014 interview with BBC Scotland, Walcott said that after some rest his ankle "is back to normal". With no World or Olympic competitions to aim for, his 2014 season will be targeted on the 2014 Commonwealth Games, to be held in Glasgow, Scotland. He had a six-week training camp in Cuba in March and planned to compete at a few events in May 2014, before taking part in another training camp in Europe so he can adjust to Glasgow's climate. He said, "My coach likes me to get away from a lot of distractions and just focus on training and being healthy."

At the IAAF Diamond League's final meeting, the Weltklasse in Zurich, Switzerland on 28 August 2014, he set a new personal best/national record of 85.77m (281 ft 4in) in the opening round, finishing second behind Germany's Thomas Rohler's toss of 87.63m.

Tokyo Olympics 2020
The 2012 London Olympic champion Keshorn Walcott did not qualify for the men's javelin throw final after finishing 7th in Group B in the qualification phase. Throwing in Group B, Walcott's best throw of 79.33 on his third throw placed him 7th in that group which was not good enough to qualify him for his third straight Olympic javelin final.

Competition record

Seasonal bests
2010 – 
2011 – 
2012 – 
2013 – 
2014 – 
2015 –  NR 
2016 – 
2017 –

See also
 Trinidad and Tobago at the 2012 Summer Olympics
 List of javelin throwers

References

External links

T&T Native Enjoys 2nd Gold in Nation's History
 Games 2012 JAVELIN Men Final; YouTube video shows Walcott in comparison to his fellow competitors in London, not simply his Gold medal-winning throw.
 London 2012 - Event Report - Men's Javelin Throw Final; detailed results of London 2012 Finals.
 Keshorn Walcott's Career Highlights and Honors; The National Sports Archives of Trinidad and Tobago lists the astonishing number of national awards and honors bestowed on Walcott following his 2012 Olympic victory.

1993 births
Living people
Trinidad and Tobago male javelin throwers
Olympic athletes of Trinidad and Tobago
Olympic gold medalists for Trinidad and Tobago
Olympic bronze medalists for Trinidad and Tobago
Athletes (track and field) at the 2012 Summer Olympics
Athletes (track and field) at the 2016 Summer Olympics
Medalists at the 2012 Summer Olympics
Commonwealth Games medallists in athletics
Athletes (track and field) at the 2014 Commonwealth Games
World Athletics Championships athletes for Trinidad and Tobago
Athletes (track and field) at the 2015 Pan American Games
Athletes (track and field) at the 2019 Pan American Games
Commonwealth Games silver medallists for Trinidad and Tobago
Pan American Games gold medalists for Trinidad and Tobago
Olympic gold medalists in athletics (track and field)
Olympic bronze medalists in athletics (track and field)
Medalists at the 2016 Summer Olympics
Pan American Games medalists in athletics (track and field)
Central American and Caribbean Games gold medalists for Trinidad and Tobago
Competitors at the 2018 Central American and Caribbean Games
Central American and Caribbean Games medalists in athletics
Medalists at the 2015 Pan American Games
Medalists at the 2019 Pan American Games
Athletes (track and field) at the 2020 Summer Olympics
Medallists at the 2014 Commonwealth Games